The Frank and Clara Turner House, at 1006 Main in Faulkton, South Dakota, is a Queen Anne style house built in 1897.  It was listed on the National Register of Historic Places in 1986.

It was built before 1889, remodeled and enlarged in 1897, and remodeled in 1905-6 and again in 1934.
It has also been known as the Eyler House.

References

Queen Anne architecture in South Dakota
Houses completed in 1897
National Register of Historic Places in Faulk County, South Dakota
Houses on the National Register of Historic Places in South Dakota